Ernazar Akmataliev (born 2 July 1998) is a Kyrgyzstani wrestler. He won the gold medal in the 70 kg event at the 2021 U23 World Wrestling Championships held in Belgrade, Serbia. He competed in the men's freestyle 65 kg event at the 2020 Summer Olympics, but lost the first match to Bajrang Punia.

He won one of the bronze medals in the men's 70kg event at the 2022 World Wrestling Championships held in Belgrade, Serbia.

Matches

References

External links
 
 
 

1998 births
Living people
Kyrgyzstani male sport wrestlers
Olympic wrestlers of Kyrgyzstan
Wrestlers at the 2020 Summer Olympics
People from Naryn Region
Asian Wrestling Championships medalists
20th-century Kyrgyzstani people
21st-century Kyrgyzstani people